Dorothy Pauline Page is a retired New Zealand historian and academic. She specialised in women's history, biography and public history.

Page was appointed as a lecturer in history at the University of Otago in 1969 and was later promoted to associate professor. In 1986 Page and her colleague Barbara Brookes introduced the first university-level women's history paper in New Zealand. She retired from the university in 2000. Page remained active in local history events; she was the president of the Otago Settlers' Association in 2007 and 2008.

In 1993, Page was awarded the New Zealand Suffrage Centennial Medal.

Publications 

 Anatomy of a Medical School: A History of Medicine at the University of Otago 1875–2000 (Otago University Press, 2008)
 Communities of Women: Historical Perspectives, co-edited with Barbara Brookes (Otago University Press, 2002)
 The National Council of Women: A Centennial History (Bridget Williams Books, 1996)

References

Year of birth missing (living people)
Academic staff of the University of Otago
New Zealand women historians
20th-century New Zealand historians
Recipients of the New Zealand Suffrage Centennial Medal 1993
21st-century New Zealand historians
Living people